Eudeilinia is a genus of moths belonging to the subfamily Drepaninae.

Species
 Eudeilinia herminiata Guenée, 1857
 Eudeilinia luteifera Dyar, 1917

References

Drepaninae
Drepanidae genera